was a town located in Shūsō District, Tōyo Region in Ehime Prefecture.

Nyukawa, Ehime